The 1928–29 National Challenge Cup was the annual open cup held by the United States Football Association now known as the Lamar Hunt U.S. Open Cup. This edition of the soccer tournament featured 100 entrants (51 in the East and 49 in the West). In this edition the Western bracket played the first round in December 1928 while the Eastern section chose to wait out the poor weather and began the first-round games in February 1929. The Cup final, which drew 21,583 spectators, broke the record for the largest crowd to see a Cup final, and remained the largest crowd, until 2010, when the Seattle Sounders FC defeat Columbus Crew in front of 31,311 spectators.

Eastern Division

Western Division

Final

See also
American Soccer Association Cup

Sources

Additional references

U.S. Open Cup
Nat